Al Brown (1902–1951) was a Panamanian boxer.

Al Brown may also refer to:

Al Brown's Tunetoppers
Al Brown (actor) who played Stan Valchek
Al Brown (baseball); see Lester Barnard
Al Brown (basketball) in 1986 NCAA Men's Division I Basketball Tournament
Al Brown (chef) of MasterChef New Zealand
Al Brown (Canadian football) in 1952 IRFU College Draft
Al Brown, an alias used by gangster Al Capone during his early days in the Chicago underworld
Alfred Radcliffe-Brown, a social anthropologist

See also
Albert Brown (disambiguation)
Alan Brown (disambiguation)
Alfred Brown (disambiguation)
Alvin Brown (disambiguation)